Cristina García Rodero (born 14 October 1949) is a Spanish photographer and member of Magnum Photos and Agence Vu photo agencies.

Life and work
Rodero was born in Puertollano, Spain, in 1949, and studied painting at Complutense University of Madrid. She has worked as a teacher.

Rodero photographs the persistence of rural traditions in modern times, such as religious rites and festivals in Spain. In Spain she is among the most celebrated documentary photographers.

Rodero joined Magnum Photos in 2005 and became a full member in 2009.

The city of Puertollano, where she was born, inaugurated the "Cristina García Rodero" Museum in 2018. A large part of the photographer's work is exhibited there. The Cristina García Rodero Museum is located in the old municipal museum of Puertollano.There are more than 2,100 square meters distributed over three floors in which are displayed about 200 photographs of the artist.

Publications
España oculta. 
España oculta. Barcelona: Lunwerg, 1989, 1998. . 
España oculta. Munich: Bucher, 1990. . 
Espagne occulte. Paris: Contrejour, 1990. . 
España: Fiestas y ritos. Text by J.M. Caballero Bonald.
España: Fiestas y ritos. Barcelona: Lunwerg, 1992. . 
Spanien. Feste und Riten. Schaffhausen: Stemmle, 1992. . 
Spagna in Fiesta. Milan: Jaca, 1994. . 
Festivals and rituals of Spain. New York: Abrams, 1994. . Translated by Wayne Finke. 
Espagne: Fêtes et traditions. Barcelona: Lunwerg, 1994. . 
Imágenes de una danza: Camuñas, "Pecados y Danzantes". Toledo: Diputación Provincial de Toledo, 1994. . 
Himerareta Supein-ten = España oculta. Mitaka, Tokyo: Mitaka City Gallery of Art, 1994. 
España Oculta: Public Celebrations in Spain, 1974-1989. Washington, D.C.: Smithsonian Institution Press, 1995. . Foreword by Julio Caro Baroja and introduction by Mary M. Crain. 
La realidad múltiple. Logroño: Ochoa, 1995. . 
Fiestas de primavera en pueblos y aldeas de España. Madrid: Prensa Española General de Revistas, 1998. . With César Justel. 
Grabarka, o monte das 600 cruces: Unha peregrinación ortodoxa en Polonia. Santiago de Compostela: Xunta de Galicia, 2000. . 
Lo Festivo y lo Sagrado. Madrid: Consejería de Cultura de la Comunidad de Madrid, 2001.  
Rituales en Haití. Madrid: Ministerio de Educación y Cultura, Dirección General de Bellas Artes y Bienes Culturales, 2001. , . With Laënnec Hurbon.
Grabarka, el monte de las 6000 cruces: Una peregrinación ortodoxa en Polonia. Granada: Diputación de Granada, 2002. . 
Cristina García Rodero. Rituale; Fotografien. Munich: Deutsche Gesellschaft für christliche Kunst, 2004. . 
Cristina García Rodero: Historia de una Pasión. 
Cristina García Rodero: Historia de una Pasión. Madrid: La Fábrica, 2004. . 
Cristina García Rodero. Madrid: La Fábrica, 2008. . Second edition. Includes Historia de una pasión by Julio Llamazares. 
A peregrinación a Santiago en Haití. Santiago de Compostela: Xunta de Galicia, 2004. . 
Paso doble - Cristina García Rodero und Giorgio von Arb: Fotografien zur Volkskultur in Spanien und in der Schweiz. Uster: Edition Villa am Aabach, 2005. . With Giorgio von Arb. 
Cristina García Rodero: María Lionza, la diosa de los ojos de agua. Madrid: Ayuntamiento, 2008. . 
España oculta: Colección de arte contemporáneo Fundación "La Caixa". Barcelona: Obra Social, Fundación "La Caixa", 2010. .  
A 1,20 metros: Los derechos de la infancia vistos desde su altura. Madrid: Consejo General de la Abogacía Española, 2010. . With other contributors. 
Transtempo. Madrid: La Fábrica; Santiago de Compostela: Xunta de Galicia, Consellería de Cultura e Turismo, 2011. , . 
Cristina García Rodero: Combatiendo la nada. Alcobendas: Ayuntamiento de Alcobendas, 2012. . 
Los siete pecados capitales. Palabra e imagen. Madrid: La Fábrica, 2014. .  With Gustavo Martín Garzo and Elisa Martin Ortega.

Awards
1989: Book Award, Rencontres d'Arles, for España Oculta.
1989: W. Eugene Smith Grant for her work documenting the culturally important festivals and rituals in rural southern European communities which are about to disappear.
1996: Premio Nacional de Fotografía, Spain.
1998: Honorary Fellowship of the Royal Photographic Society.

Exhibitions with others
1994: The Photographers' Gallery, London.
2001: Venice Biennale, Venice.
2016: Photobiennale, Moscow

Collections
Museum of Fine Arts Houston

References

External links
 Rodero's profile at Magnum Photos
 Américas

1949 births
Living people
People from Puertollano
Spanish women photographers
Magnum photographers
Complutense University of Madrid alumni
Spanish photojournalists
Street photographers
20th-century women photographers
21st-century women photographers
Women photojournalists